Harry Kwatny is an American mechanical engineer, the current S. Herbert Raynes Professor of Mechanical Engineering at Drexel University, and a published author.

References

Drexel University faculty
American mechanical engineers
Year of birth missing (living people)
Living people